Lioptilodes doeri is a species of moth in the genus Lioptilodes known from Argentina, Brazil, and Peru. Moths of this species take flight in August and October and have a wingspan of approximately 22–23 millimetres.

References

Platyptiliini
Moths described in 1996
Taxa named by Cees Gielis